Sukashitrochus is a genus of sea snails, marine gastropod mollusks in the family Scissurellidae.

Species
Species within the genus Sukashitrochus include:
 Sukashitrochus atkinsoni (Tenison Woods, 1876)
 Sukashitrochus carinatus (A. Adams, 1862) - type species
 Sukashitrochus dorbignyi (Audouin, 1826)
 † Sukashitrochus estotiensis Lozouet, 1999
 † Sukashitrochus kaiparaensis (Laws, 1941) 
 Sukashitrochus lyallensis (Finlay, 1926)
 Sukashitrochus morleti (Crosse, 1880) - synonyms: Sukashitrochus indonesicus Bandel, 1998; Sukashitrochus simplex Bandel, 1998
 † Sukashitrochus ngatutura (Laws, 1936) 
 Sukashitrochus pulcher (Petterd, 1884)
 † Sukashitrochus saubadae Lozouet, 1998 
 † Sukashitrochus terquemi (Deshayes, 1865) 
Species brought into synonymy
 Sukashitrochus armillatus (Yaron, 1983): synonym of Sukashitrochus dorbignyi (Audouin, 1826)
 Sukashitrochus indonesicus Bandel, 1998: synonym of Sukashitrochus morleti (Crosse, 1880)
 Sukashitrochus maraisi Herbert, 1986: synonym of Sukashitrochus dorbignyi (Audouin, 1826)
 Sukashitrochus mirandus (A. Adams, 1862): synonym of Sinezona miranda (A. Adams, 1862) (nomen dubium)
 Sukashitrochus simplex Bandel, 1998: synonym of Sukashitrochus morleti (Crosse, 1880)
 Sukashitrochus tasmanicus (Petterd, 1879): synonym of Sukashitrochus atkinsoni (Tenison Woods, 1876)
 Sukashitrochus tricarinatus (Yaron, 1983): synonym of Sukashitrochus dorbignyi (Audouin, 1826)

References

 Geiger D.L. (2012) Monograph of the little slit shells. Volume 1. Introduction, Scissurellidae. pp. 1-728. Volume 2. Anatomidae, Larocheidae, Depressizonidae, Sutilizonidae, Temnocinclidae. pp. 729–1291. Santa Barbara Museum of Natural History Monographs Number 7.

External links
 Geiger D. L. (2003). "Phylogenetic assessment of characters proposed for the generic classification of Recent Scissurellidae (Gastropoda: Vetigastropoda) with a description of one new genus and six new species from Easter Island and Australia". Molluscan Research 23(1): 21-83. , abstract. PDF.
 Haszprunaer G. (1988). "Sukashitrochus sp., a scissurellid with heteropod-like locomotion (Mollusca, Archaeogastropoda)". Annalen des Naturhistorischen Museums in Wien 90B: 367-371. PDF.

Scissurellidae